The voiced velar plosive or stop is a type of consonantal sound used in many spoken languages. 

Some languages have the voiced pre-velar plosive, which is articulated slightly more front compared with the place of articulation of the prototypical velar plosive, though not as front as the prototypical palatal plosive.

Conversely, some languages have the voiced post-velar plosive, which is articulated slightly behind the place of articulation of the prototypical velar plosive, though not as back as the prototypical uvular plosive.

IPA symbol
Strictly, the IPA symbol is the so-called single-storey G , but the double-storey G  is considered an acceptable alternative. The Unicode character  renders as either a single-storey G or a double-storey G depending on font; the character  is always a single-storey G, but it is generally available only in fonts with the IPA Extensions Unicode character block.

Features

Features of the voiced velar stop:

Occurrence

Absent stop  is an areal feature (see also Voiceless bilabial stop). Missing , (when the language uses voicing to contrast stops) on the other hand, is widely scattered around the world, for example /ɡ/ is not a native phoneme of Belarusian, Dutch, Czech, or Slovak and occurs only in borrowed words in those languages. A few languages, such as Modern Standard Arabic and part of the Levantine dialects (e.g.

It seems that  is somewhat more difficult to articulate than the other basic stops. This could have two effects:  and  might become confused, and the distinction is lost, or perhaps a  never develops when a language first starts making voicing distinctions. With uvulars, where there is even less space between the glottis and tongue for airflow, the imbalance is more extreme: Voiced  is much rarer than voiceless .

Many Indo-Aryan languages, such as Hindustani, have a two-way contrast between aspirated and plain .

Occurrence

See also
 Index of phonetics articles

Notes

References

External links
 

Velar consonants
Plosives
Pulmonic consonants
Voiced oral consonants
Central consonants